is a passenger railway station located in the city of Kōnan, Kōchi Prefecture, Japan. It is operated by the third-sector Tosa Kuroshio Railway with the station number "GN35".

Lines
All Asa Line trains, both rapid and local, stop at the station.

Layout
The station consists of two opposed side platforms serving two elevated tracks. There is no station building but both platforms have enclosed shelters for waiting passengers. A shop cum tourist information centre under the elevated structure also serves as a waiting room. Access to the two platforms is by separate flights of steps. A designated parking area is provided for bicycles under the elevated structure.

Adjacent stations

Station mascot
Each station on the Asa Line features a cartoon mascot character designed by Takashi Yanase, a local cartoonist from Kōchi Prefecture. The mascot for Akaoka Station is an artist holding two paintbrushes named , recalling Hirose Kinzō, a Japanese painter who lived in Akaoka at the end of the Edo period. A display of figurines of the various station mascots on the Asa Line is located under the elevated structure at Akaoka Station.

History

Passenger statistics
In fiscal 2011, the station was used by an average of 268 passengers daily.

Surrounding area
Konan City Hall Asaoka branch (formerly Asaoka Town Hall)
Kochi Prefectural Shiroyama High School
Konan Municipal Akaoka Junior High School
Japan National Route 55

See also 
List of railway stations in Japan

References

External links

Railway stations in Kōchi Prefecture
Railway stations in Japan opened in 2002
Kōnan, Kōchi